Congregation B'nai Israel is a Conservative synagogue in Toledo, Ohio, United States.  Founded in 1866, it is the oldest synagogue  in Toledo.

Historic building

The congregation's former building is a registered historic building listed in the National Register on 2005-10-06.  It is currently in use as a church.

Current building
The congregation moved later to a building on Kenwood Blvd, and more recently to a newly constructed building behind the reform synagogue Shomer Emunim on Sylvania Ave.

Notes

External links
 Congregation B'nai Israel website

Synagogues on the National Register of Historic Places in Ohio
Religious organizations established in 1866
Buildings and structures in Toledo, Ohio
Culture of Toledo, Ohio
19th-century synagogues
Conservative synagogues in Ohio
1866 establishments in Ohio
National Register of Historic Places in Lucas County, Ohio
Synagogues completed in 1913
Arts and Crafts synagogues
Arts and Crafts architecture in the United States
Synagogues completed in 1957